Frumales is a small village in the province of Segovia, Spain. It has a population of 130 registered residents and covers an area of 28 km². The terrain is made mostly of pine forests and cultivated fields, although farming is no longer the backbone of its economy, instead being reliant on pensions and the work of neighboring towns. Its main attractions are the Cerquilla River,  the Windmill of the Aldehuela, and the Giant Old Elm.

Notable people 
People who were born in, residents of, or otherwise closely associated with Frumales include:
 Luis Minguela (born 1960), international footballer

References 

Municipalities in the Province of Segovia
Populated places in the Province of Segovia